Dolicharthria desertalis is a moth in the family Crambidae. It was described by George Hampson in 1907. It is found in South Africa.

References

Endemic moths of South Africa
Moths described in 1907
Spilomelinae
Moths of Africa